"Athena" (the working title being "Theresa") is a song written by Pete Townshend and recorded by The Who. It appears as the first track on the group's tenth album It's Hard, released in 1982. Written for actress Theresa Russell, the song was the first single from It's Hard. The single was a moderate success reaching the top 40 in both Britain and America.

Background
"Athena" was originally written by Pete Townshend after an encounter with the American actress Theresa Russell. After seeing a Pink Floyd performance on their Wall Tour, with Russell and his friend, Bill Minkin, Townshend was rejected by the actress when he attempted to romance her. Townshend said of the incident:

Under the working title "Theresa," the song's name was changed to "Athena." Despite this alteration, Townshend still felt the song was too personal, claiming, "It was just too revealing." Roger Daltrey, however, disliked the song for this change.

A demo for the original "Theresa" was first recorded and presented to The Who by Pete Townshend during the Face Dances sessions. However, the song was not used until It's Hard.

On "Athena" Roger Daltrey and Townshend share lead vocals. John Entwistle also adds horns to the track.

Release
"Athena" was released as the first single from It's Hard, backed with "A Man Is a Man" in Britain and "It's Your Turn" in America. The single achieved moderate chart success, reaching number 28 on the US Billboard Hot 100, but received good airplay on album-oriented rock and later classic rock radio formats. 
"Athena" also reached number 40 on the UK Singles Chart, making it both the band's last UK and US top 40 single. The single also reached number five in Canada.

Billboard described it as a "comparatively lilting love song set to a fast but fluid track" and said it was "one of the Who's most melodic and warmhearted" songs.

In addition to appearing on It's Hard, "Athena" also was released on both The Ultimate Collection and the deluxe edition of The Who Hits 50! compilation albums.

Live performances
The Who only played "Athena" a total of ten times on the band's 1982 tour, and have not played the song again ever since.

On October 30, 2017, at Ruth Eckerd Hall in Clearwater, Florida, Roger Daltrey performed "Athena" live for the first time in 35 years.

References

1982 singles
The Who songs
Songs written by Pete Townshend
Polydor Records singles
Warner Records singles
Song recordings produced by Glyn Johns
1982 songs